Piratbyrån ( "The Pirate Bureau") was a Swedish think tank established to support the free sharing of information, culture, and intellectual property. Piratbyrån provided a counterpoint to lobby groups such as the Swedish Anti-Piracy Bureau.

In 2005 Piratbyrån released an anthology entitled Copy Me, containing selected texts previously available from its website. Members of Piratbyrån participated in debates on Swedish Radio and Swedish Television and also gave several lectures in other European countries, such as at the 2005 22nd Chaos Communication Congress in Berlin.

Piratbyrån's activities might have changed over the years, partly as a result of the addition of the Pirate Party to the Swedish political scene. During Walpurgis Night 2007, Piratbyrån burned all of their remaining copies of Copy Me in a ritual-like performance, declaring:

The file-sharing debate is hereby buried. When we talk about file-sharing from now on it's as one of many ways to copy. We talk about better and worse ways of indexing, archiving and copying—not whether copying is right or wrong. Winter is pouring down the hillside. Make way for spring!

Jonas Andersson, a Swedish researcher specialized in the politics of file-sharing, gave this brief definition in October 2009:

Piratbyrån is entirely separate from The Pirate Party; it is more of a loosely organised think-tank, a website, a philosophical greenhouse or FAQ guide to digitization.

The MPA-funded Svenska Antipiratbyrån (Swedish Anti-Piracy Bureau), an agency devoted to fighting copyright infringement, was formed in 2001, before Piratbyrån. Piratbyrån humorously copied the name of their opponent, removing the "anti".

In June 2010 the group disbanded following the death of co-founder and prominent member Ibrahim Botani, also known as Ibi Kopimi Botani. Several former members of Piratbyrån are now involved in Telecomix. The front page of the website was replaced with the three words  (Swedish for 'Closed for reflection').

Self-definition
In 2008 Piratbyrån published a report titled Piratbyrån - The Bureau of Piracy Activities 2007 which starts with the following description of the organisation:

Definition by Prix Ars Electronica jury
As Piratbyrån received an "award of distinction" at Prix Ars Electronica in 2009, the jury statement said:

BitTorrent tracker

Members of Piratbyrån founded the BitTorrent tracker The Pirate Bay in 2003 as a Swedish language site. The Pirate Bay now operates independently from Piratbyrån, although a number of The Pirate Bay administrators were also active in Piratbyrån.

Police raid
On the morning of 31 May 2006, the servers of both The Pirate Bay, a popular Swedish BitTorrent tracker, and Piratbyrån were confiscated in a raid by Swedish police. The seizure was part of investigation into possible illegal activities on the part of The Pirate Bay. Piratbyrån and the Antipiratbyrån set up a temporary news blog during the investigation.

Activities in 2007
In Piratbyrån - The Bureau of Piracy Activities 2007, published in 2008, Piratbyrån list its activities for the year 2007. Activities by Piratbyrån members include lectures at universities and conferences, the publication of reports, participation in art projects and research projects, an interview with Vanity Fair in February 2007, participation in the planning of The Oil of the 21st Century conference in Berlin, presentations at a Norwegian computer party (The Gathering), interviews to the media regarding the raid on The Pirate Bay, opening of a webshop to sell Kopimi Klothing, participation in the organisation of protests to mark the one-year anniversary of the police raid on The Pirate Bay, attendance of the BELEF07 festival in Belgrade (Serbia), and participation in the organisation of a one-day art event in Stockholm titled "Who Makes And Owns Your Work".

In March 2007 Piratbyrån members were invited to a meeting with the executive group for the Swedish Film Institute, to share their views about film and copying. According to Piratbyrån "The leadership listens with interest — only to some months later launch new anti-piracy initiatives...". In the same month Piratbyrån collaborates with the Norwegian group Piratgruppen, launching the counter-campaign "Piracy frees music" (promoted via The Pirate Bay), in response to the "Piracy kills music" anti-piracy campaign by the Norwegian record industry.

In 2007 members of Piratbyrån also contributed to the production of the film Steal This Film (Part Two), which features interviews with Piratbyrån members and was released in December 2007.

Activities in 2009
Piratbyrån organized the "Spectrial", a theatricalizing intervention in The Pirate Bay trial in Stockholm, early in 2009.

Installed the Embassy of Piracy - The Embassy of Piracy, for the First Internet Pavilion at the Venice Biennial

At the Prix Ars Electronica Piratbyrån received an "award of distinction" (including a prize money of 5000 euro) in the category "Digital Communities". The motivation of the jury underlined the Piratbyrån "never forget that humor and irony are among the strongest weapons available to cultural producers."

Kopimi

The Kopimi symbol was conceived in January 2005 by Piratbyrån co-founder Ibrahim Botani. The logo, pronounced "copy me", can be used to specifically request people to copy and distribute a work, for any purpose. Botani intended the logo to be the opposite of copyright, which usually restricts copying a work, and as a unifying symbol of the anti-copyright ideas Piratbyrån stood for. As such, Kopimi may be considered an anti-copyright notice of sorts.

Later in 2005, the Kopimi logotype was included in the Piratbyrån book Copy Me. In June of that year, the Kopimi symbol was added to the front page of the Pirate Bay. Throughout the next 15 years, three different variants of the logo were used on the front page, until it was removed sometime around March/April 2020. The history section of the site stated: "Some of you may have noticed that little symbol at the bottom of the page, the pyramid. It's a symbol called Kopimi (Copy Me) which was founded by an old friend of ours, the artist Ibi Botani. It's basically about promoting copying. Using the kopimi symbol on something not only shows that it is ok to copy it, it says it wants to be copied, mixed or manipulated!"

While Kopimi may appear to be a radical free content license, in effect similar to Creative Commons Zero, no one associated with Piratbyrån ever called Kopimi a license, instead describing it as a symbol of certain ideas. The website of Kopimi contains no terms or legal text. The Open Source Initiative, Free Software Foundation, or any other organisation within the open-source movement, does not list Kopimi as an approved license.

Wikimedia Commons, a repository of free content and a sister site of Wikipedia, allows users to label their files with Kopimi.

Kopimism

Kopimism and kopimist are terms derived from Botani's symbol. It is unclear who coined them, but they have been used since at least July 2006. In January 2007, the Pirate Bay used the terms when they attempted to buy Sealand, a sea fort off the coast of England and a self-proclaimed country. The Pirate Bay declared: "To make sure the owners will be kopimistic and that the country won't be governed by people that do not care about its future, we have come up with a plan. With the help of all the kopimists on Internets, we want to buy Sealand."

The Missionary Church of Kopimism was founded in 2010 by Isak Gerson, a philosophy student and a member of the Pirate Party of Sweden. After two failed attempts, Kopimism was officially recognized as a religion by the Swedish government in January 2012. The Church considers copying a holy virtue, and uses various Kopimi symbols to present itself.

Copie

Inspired by Kopimi, the Pirate Party of Brazil created their own version of the concept called "Copie", which plays both on the Portuguese words "copie" (meaning copy) and "co-pie" (meaning tweet together). The Copie logo shows 5 birds tweeting together.

Notes
 Three different versions of the Kopimi symbol were used on the Pirate Bay front page throughout the years. The first was a blue pyramid with a K in it (picture). It was added around 15–17 June 2005 (see these archived versions: 15 June 2005, 17 June 2005) and stood until May/June 2006 (see: 13 May 2006, 13 June 2006). It was then replaced with another pyramid, but with a newly stylised K in it, and striped red and white, similar to the US flag (picture, higher res). It stood until c. January 2009 (30 December 2008, 6 January 2009, 12 January 2009). The third was just the stylised K (picture), which stood for the next 11 years, until March/April 2020. From 6/7 March to c. 11 April the site was offline. After that, a new front page was used that no longer has the Kopimi logo (see archived versions from 6 March to 12 April).

See also
 Copyleft
 Criticism of copyright
 Culture vs. Copyright
 Internet freedom
 Missionary Church of Kopimism
 Pirate Party of Sweden (Piratpartiet) (not affiliated with Piratbyrån)
 The Pirate Bay A bittorrent site.
 Steal This Film
 Telecomix

References

External links

 Official website (archived)
 Kopimi
 Piratgruppen.org - Danish sister organization
 Art Liberated - Another project from Piratbyrån, highlighting remix culture and opposing censorship of art.
 Slashdot on Piratbyrån's May Day Demonstration 2004
 Press release about Piratbyrån's May Day Demonstration 2005
 The Grey Commons, strategic considerations in the copyfight Text by Piratbyrån's Palle Torsson and Rasmus Fleischer, presenting the activities of 2005.
 The Pirate Bay and Piratbyrån taken down by Police
 Between artworks and networks: Navigating through the crisis of copyright Theoretical lecture by Piratbyrån's Rasmus Fleischer.
 Presentation of Piratbyrån by Magnus Eriksson, from the Bzoom festival in Brno, October 2006.

2003 establishments in Sweden
2010 disestablishments in Sweden
Think tanks established in 2003
Think tanks disestablished in 2010
Intellectual property activism
Politics of Sweden
Political and economic think tanks based in Europe
Science and technology think tanks
Think tanks based in Sweden
Hacker culture
Open content